Lousehill Copse is a local nature reserve in the Tilehurst suburb of the English town of Reading. The majority of the site comprises natural mature woodland surrounded by housing and featuring a pond, whilst the northern section of the reserve, also known as Comparts Plantation, is a grassy meadow area. To the south the reserve is crossed by Dee Road.

Along with Blundells Copse & McIlroy Park, Lousehill Copse forms part of West Reading Woodlands.

History

The ancient Woodland has been dated back to over 300 years ago.

In 1992 site was designated a Local Nature Reserve.

Fauna

The site has the following fauna:

Birds

Red kite
Great tit
European robin
Eurasian magpie
Eurasian bullfinch
Goldcrest
Eurasian treecreeper
Long-tailed tit
Lesser spotted woodpecker
Great spotted woodpecker
European green woodpecker
Tawny owl
Jay

Flora

The site has the following flora:

Trees

Tilia × europaea
Quercus robur
Taxus baccata
Betula pendula
Fagus sylvatica
Chestnut
Hazel
Ilex aquifolium

Plants

Hyacinthoides non-scripta
Ulex
Genisteae

References

Parks and open spaces in Reading, Berkshire
Local Nature Reserves in Berkshire